= Top Rank Basketball Showcase =

The Top Rank Basketball Showcase (commonly referred to as "TRS" or "The Top Rank Showcase") is an organization that hosts a series of National Collegiate Athletic Association exposure events for elite men's and women's high school basketball players throughout the United States and Canada. The Top Rank Basketball Showcase was established on May 1, 2016 by Founder and current CEO Ashton West.

The organization was formed to provide a platform for high school basketball players to attain exposure through a competitive basketball experience. Providing athletes the opportunity to play in front of college coaches and national media outlets against the best competition available in those regions.
